Bikkia tetrandra (Chamorro: gausali) is an herbaceous member of the family Rubiaceae. It is native to Papuasia and islands of the western Pacific. The stems ignite easily and can be used to make torches or candles.

References

tetrandra
Flora of Papuasia
Flora of the Pacific
Plants described in 1782